Théâtre Espace Go (commonly known as Espace Go, French for "Go Space") is a theatre in Montreal, Quebec, Canada. Founded in 1985 as the feminist Théâtre Expérimental des Femmes, the company changed its name to Théâtre Espace Go in 1994 and broadened its mandate.

In 1988, it received the Grand Prix from the Conseil des arts de Montréal for its contributions to the city's culture. In 1991, it was honoured with a special prize from the Association Québécoise des Critiques de Théâtre.

In 1995, Espace Go moved to a new $5,000,000 complex on Saint Laurent Boulevard. Architect Éric Gauthier received the Prix d'Excellence from the Ordre des architectes du Québec for the building, which was formally inaugurated on March 9, 1995. The initial production in the new space was Philippe Minyana's Inventaires, directed by Louise Laprade, who was one of the co-founders of the Théâtre Expérimental des Femmes.

Espace Go serves as a home for several Montreal theatre companies, including Théâtre PÀP and Théâtre I.N.K.

References

External links
 

Theatres in Montreal
1985 establishments in Quebec
Feminist theatre